The 2019 Canadian U18 Curling Championships were held from April 2 to 7 at the Glen Allan Recreation Complex and the Sherwood Park Curling Club in Sherwood Park, Alberta.

Men

Round-robin standings

Final round-robin standings

Knockout round

Source:

A Bracket

B Bracket

Playoffs

Semifinals
Sunday, April 7, 9:00am

Bronze medal game
Sunday, April 7, 1:00pm

Final
Sunday, April 7, 1:00pm

Women

Round-robin standings

Final round-robin standings

Knockout round

Source:

A Bracket

B Bracket

Playoffs

Semifinals
Sunday, April 7, 9:00am

Bronze medal game
Sunday, April 7, 1:00pm

Final
Sunday, April 7, 1:00pm

Notes

References

External links

U18 Championships
Canadian U18 Curling Championships, 2019
2019 in Alberta
Canadian U18 Curling